FC Dynamo Khmelnytskyi was a Ukrainian football team based in Khmelnytskyi, Khmelnytskyi Oblast, Ukraine. The club withdrew from the Professional Football League during the 2013–14 Ukrainian Second League season due to their financial situation.

History
On 2 March 2009 the PFL Bureau received an appeal from a communal company "FC "Podillya-Khmelnytskyi" (city of Khmelnytskyi) of 21 January 2009 that it withdraws from the Professional Football League of Ukraine and handing over its rights and duties according with the Agreement on Succession to a limited liability company "PFC "Dynamo" (city of Khmelnytskyi)".

In the season (2008–09) in Druha Liha A this football club started out as a subsection of the association Dynamo athletic franchise and they finished it in 8th place in his group.

Managers
  Volodymyr Reva (2009)
  Viktor Muravskyi (2009–2010)

League and cup history

{|class="wikitable"
|-bgcolor="#efefef"
! Season
! Div.
! Pos.
! Pl.
! W
! D
! L
! GS
! GA
! P
!Domestic Cup
!colspan=2|Europe
!Notes
|-
|align=center|Before 2008
|align=center colspan=13| refer to Podillya Khmelnytskyi
|-
|align=center|2008–09
|align=center rowspan=5|3rd "A"
|align=center|8
|align=center|32
|align=center|14
|align=center|5
|align=center|13
|align=center|32
|align=center|38
|align=center|47
|align=center|1/32 finals
|align=center|
|align=center|
|align=center|
|-
|align=center|2009–10
|align=center|5
|align=center|20
|align=center|10
|align=center|3
|align=center|7
|align=center|28
|align=center|16
|align=center|33
|align=center|1/64 finals
|align=center|
|align=center|
|align=center|
|-
|align=center|2010–11
|align=center|9
|align=center|22
|align=center|7
|align=center|4
|align=center|11
|align=center|19
|align=center|29
|align=center|22
|align=center|1/32 finals
|align=center|
|align=center|
|align=center|−3
|-
|align=center|2011–12
|align=center|10
|align=center|26
|align=center|6
|align=center|4
|align=center|16
|align=center|23
|align=center|50
|align=center|22
|align=center|1/64 finals
|align=center|
|align=center|
|align=center|
|-
|align=center rowspan="2"|2012–13
|align=center|10
|align=center|20 	
|align=center|4 		 	
|align=center|5 		 	 	
|align=center|11 				
|align=center|12 	  		 		  	
|align=center|22 		  	
|align=center|17
|align=center rowspan=2|1/32 finals
|align=center|
|align=center|
|align=center|
|-
|align=center|3rd "3"
|align=center|4
|align=center|6 			
|align=center|0 	 			
|align=center|1 		
|align=center|5 				
|align=center|1 	 			
|align=center|13 		
|align=center|1
|align=center|
|align=center|
|align=center|Relegation groups
|-
|align=center|2013–14
|align=center|3rd
|align=center|19
|align=center|36
|align=center|3
|align=center|2
|align=center|31
|align=center|18
|align=center|52
|align=center|11
|align=center|1/32 finals
|align=center|
|align=center|
|align=center bgcolor=red|Withdrew
|}

See also
 FC Podillya Khmelnytskyi
 FC Krasyliv

Notes

References

External links
  Unofficial team website

 
Dynamo Khmelnytskyi, FC
Association football clubs established in 2009
Association football clubs disestablished in 2013
2009 establishments in Ukraine
2013 disestablishments in Ukraine
Sport in Khmelnytskyi, Ukraine
Football clubs in Khmelnytskyi Oblast
Police association football clubs in Ukraine